The 2006 MLS SuperDraft, held in Philadelphia on January 20, 2006, was the seventh incarnation of the annual Major League Soccer SuperDraft. The first selection originally belonged to Chivas USA, but they traded it to the MetroStars for the fifth overall selection and Jason Hernandez. The MetroStars then drafted Marvell Wynne. The draft was followed by the 2006 MLS Supplemental Draft.

The draft has produced multiple United States men's national soccer team players, including Sacha Kljestan, Jozy Altidore (2nd round), and Jonathan Bornstein (4th round).

Player selection 
Any player whose name is marked with an * was contracted under the Generation Adidas program.

Round one

Round one trades

Round two

Round two trades

Round three

Round three trades

Round four

Round four trades

See also 
 Draft (sports)
 Generation Adidas
 Major League Soccer
 MLS SuperDraft

References 

Major League Soccer drafts
SuperDraft
MLS SuperDraft
MLS SuperDraft
Soccer in Pennsylvania
Sports in Philadelphia
Events in Philadelphia
MLS SuperDraft